"Midnight Run" is a song by British singer Example from Example's third studio album, Playing in the Shadows. It was released on 4 December 2011 in the United Kingdom as the album's fourth single with an entire remix album on iTunes. The song was produced by Feed Me.

Music video
A music video to accompany the release of "Midnight Run" was first released onto YouTube on 21 October 2011 at a total length of four minutes and four seconds. The video was filmed in Iceland, and sees Example sink into his bathtub before emerging out of an Icelandic spring. He then proceeds to embark on a road trip with a mysterious blonde woman before turning up at a remote cottage below the Northern Lights. The car used in the video, with the special license plate FEED ME to honour the song's producer, is a classic Ford Mustang Fastback from 1966 equipped with a High Performance 289 V-8 and the famous Pony Interior package in Red.

Track listing

Chart performance
The song peaked at number 30 on the UK Singles Chart marking his eighth top 40 hit.

Release history

References

2011 singles
Example (musician) songs
Ministry of Sound singles
Dubstep songs
Music videos directed by Adam Powell